Jin Party is a 2019 Burmese comedy film, directed by Yarzawin Ko starring Yan Aung, Min Maw Kun, Khin Hlaing, Yair Yint Aung, Htoo Aung, Eaindra Kyaw Zin, Yin Let, Shwe Eain Si, Bella Myat Thiri Lwin. The film, produced by Bo Bo Film Production premiered in Myanmar on August 22, 2019.

Cast
Yan Aung as Moe Lin Soe
Lu Min as Let Yone
Min Maw Kun as Kyaw Su
Yair Yint Aung as Yoe Yar
Htoo Aung as Bala
Khin Hlaing as Myo Win Soe
Eaindra Kyaw Zin as Sabal Phyu
Shwe Eain Si as Mary
Yin Let as Dar Dar
Bella Myat Thiri Lwin as Ngwe Thoon

References

External links

2019 films
2010s Burmese-language films
Burmese comedy films
Films shot in Myanmar